Individual Choice is an album by French jazz fusion violinist Jean-Luc Ponty that was released in 1983.

A music video for the title track was produced by Louis Schwarzberg in 1984, consisting of time-lapsed footage of New York City, Chicago, and Seattle.

2009 Bootleg CD
In 2009, a bootleg version of the album was released on CD by a private distributor. The bootleg track listing swaps the placement of tracks 2 and 4. The CD also changed the name of the track "Individual Choice" to "The Inclement Weather Song".

Track listing

Personnel 
 Jean-Luc Ponty – violin (all), synthesizers (1-6), keyboard bass (3, 5, 6), rhythm computer (3), organ (5)
 George Duke – Minimoog solo (3)
 Allan Holdsworth – guitar (5, 7)
 Randy Jackson – bass (2, 7)
 Rayford Griffin – drums (2, 7), percussion (6)

Production notes
Jean-Luc Ponty – producer
Gary Skardina – drum recordings
Peter R. Kelsey – engineer, mixing
Stuart Graham – engineer, assistant engineer
Steve Hall – engineer, mastering
Mark Hanauer – photography
Bob Defrin – art direction

Charts

References

External links 
 Jean-Luc Ponty - Individual Choice (1983) album review by Richard S. Ginell, credits & releases at AllMusic
 Jean-Luc Ponty - Individual Choice (1983) album releases & credits at Discogs
 Jean-Luc Ponty - Individual Choice (1983) album credits & user reviews at ProgArchives.com
 Jean-Luc Ponty - Individual Choice (1983) album to be listened as stream on Spotify

1983 albums
Jean-Luc Ponty albums
Atlantic Records albums